Eristalis similis is a European species of hoverfly.

References

Diptera of Europe
Eristalinae
Insects described in 1817
Taxa named by Carl Fredrik Fallén